Herbert Haydn Barker (1883 – 14 June 1924) was an English professional golfer and golf course architect who played in the early 20th century. Barker's best performance came in the 1909 U.S. Open when he tied for seventh place. He had an identical finish in the 1911 U.S. Open.

Early life
Barker was born in Huddersfield, England, in 1883.

Golf career
Barker had a successful amateur career, winning several tournaments in Great Britain in the early 1900s representing Huddersfield Golf Club. His wins included the Yorkshire Amateur in 1904 and 1906, the Irish Amateur Open Championship in 1906 and the Dartmouth Bowl for three consecutive years starting in 1905. He played in the Amateur Championship in 1905 and 1907 and qualified for the 1907 Open Championship. He also played for the England amateur team against Scotland in 1907. He sailed from Southampton on 21 September 1907 to take up a professional position in America.

Barker served as head professional at Garden City Golf Club in Garden City, New York, from 1908 to 1911. He found golf to be more competitive in America and failed to win any events. But he also discovered less challenging courses and soon began designing and remodelling layouts with the intention of elevating the game in the United States. After 1911 his appearances in tournaments were less frequent and he concentrated more on his work as a golf course architect.

Golf course designer
Barker moved to the southern United States after leaving Garden City, and laid out Roebuck Country Club in Birmingham, Alabama, and stayed on as head professional for a time before taking a position at the Country Club of Virginia in Richmond in the fall of 1914.

Military service
Barker took a two-month leave of absence from the Country Club of Virginia and sailed back to Britain on 30 July 1915 to enlist in the military, joining the Royal Flying Corps. He was stationed at South Shields, Seaton Carew, and RNAS Killingholme.

Death
Although he told friends he intended to return after the war, Barker never returned to America. He died on 14 June 1924 after an extended illness. A death certificate, registered two days after his death, in the Sub-District of Brighouse in the County of York, WR, states that he died of "1) Myocarditis-6 months and 2) Auricular Fibrillation-2 months" and also had "Rheumatism 18 years ago". The death, which occurred at 23 Clough Lane, Brighouse, was in the presence of his wife, Evelyn Barker. The certificate listed Walker's date of death as 14 June 1924, his age as 41 and his occupation as "Timber Merchant", and was certified by A. Latimer Walker MB.

Courses designed
Sources:

Note: This list may be incomplete.

 The Springhaven Club (1904) – private in Wallingford, PennsylvaniaIda Dixon design (1904), alterations by Barker (1910)
 Country Club of Virginia (Westhampton Course) (1908) – private in Richmond, Virginia
 Arcola Country Club (1909) – private in Paramus, New Jersey
 Rumson Country Club (1910) – private in Rumson, New Jersey
 Columbia Country Club (1911) – private in Chevy Chase, Maryland
 Capital City Country Club (1911) – private in Atlanta, Georgia
 Raritan Valley Country Club (formerly Somerville Country Club) (1911) – private in Bridgewater, New Jersey 
 Mayfield Country Club (1911), with Bert Way – private in Cleveland, Ohio
 Grove Park Inn Country Club (1911) – private in Asheville, North Carolina
 Druid Hills Country Club (1912) – private in Atlanta, Georgia†
 Don Hawkins Municipal Golf Club (formerly Roebuck Country Club) (1914) – public in Birmingham, Alabama

Results in major championships

Note: Barker only played in the Amateur Championship, the Open Championship and the U.S. Open.

? = finish unknown
"T" indicates a tie for a place
R256, R128, R64, R32, R16, QF, SF = Round in which player lost in match play

Team appearances
Amateur
England–Scotland Amateur Match (representing England): 1907

Notes

† Remodelled by A. W. Tillinghast (1935) and Bob Cupp (2003)

References

English male golfers
Golf course architects
British Army personnel of World War I
Royal Flying Corps soldiers
Sportspeople from Huddersfield
1883 births
1924 deaths